Rock'n Roll Revue is a 1955 American film directed by Joseph Kohn. The film was compiled for theatrical exhibition from the made-for-television short films produced by Snader and Studio Telescriptions, with newly filmed host segments by Willie Bryant.

The film is also known as Harlem Rock 'n' Roll (in the United Kingdom) and Rock and Roll Review (American alternative title).

Cast 
Cholly Atkins as himself
Louie Bellson as himself
Delta Rhythm Boys as Themselves
Ruth Brown as herself
Willie Bryant as himself - Master of Ceremonies
The Clovers as Themselves
Nat "King" Cole as himself
Charles "Honi" Coles as himself
Larry Darnell as himself
Martha Davis as herself
Duke Ellington as himself
Lionel Hampton as himself
Little Buck as himself
Mantan Moreland as himself
Leonard Reed as himself
Nipsey Russell as himself
Big Joe Turner as himself
Dinah Washington as herself

Soundtrack 
Duke Ellington and His Orchestra - "The Mooche"
Big Joe Turner - "Okimoshebop"
Dinah Washington - "Only a Moment Ago"
Nat "King" Cole and his trio - "The Trouble With Me Is You"
Larry Darnell - "What More Do You Want Me to Do"
The Clovers - "Your Cash Ain't Nothin' But Trash"

See also 
Rhythm and Blues Revue

Notes

External links 

1955 films
American black-and-white films
Films directed by Joseph Kohn
1950s English-language films